Bieńkowski - is a Polish coat of arms. It was used by one szlachta family in the times of the Polish–Lithuanian Commonwealth.

History

Blazon

Notable bearers

Notable bearers of this coat of arms include:
  Jan Bieńkowski

See also 

 Polish heraldry
 Heraldry
 Coat of arms
 List of Polish nobility coats of arms

Related coat of arms 

 Korwin coat of arms

Bibliography
 Juliusz Karol Ostrowski: Księga herbowa rodów polskich. T. 2. Warszawa: Główny skład księgarnia antykwarska B. Bolcewicza, 1897, s. 23.

External links 
 Słownik genealogiczny - leksykon 

Polish coats of arms